Anthidium paitense is a species of bee in the family Megachilidae, the leaf-cutter, carder, or mason bees.

Distribution
Peru

References

paitense
Insects described in 1926